Roger Rolhion (born 4 January 1909, date of death unknown) was a French footballer and coach, born in Montpellier (Hérault).

Biography
Rolhion made his debut as a player for his local club, SO Montpellier with whom he won the Coupe de France in 1929.

He played three internationals as a striker and once as a defender.

Later, Rolhion became a manager, coaching AS Aix-en-Provence, Olympique de Marseille and SO Montpellier.

Playing career 
 1928-1935 : SO Montpellier
 1935-1940 : AS Saint-Étienne
 1942-1943 : AS Saint-Étienne
 1943-1944 : EF Lyon Lyonnais
 Ganges
 AS Aix-en-Provence

Honours as a player 
 French international from 1931 to 1933 (4 caps, 2 goals)
 Winner of the Coupe de France 1929 with SO Montpellier
 Finalist of the Coupe de France 1931 with SO Montpellier
 Champion of the Ligue du Sud-Est 1932 with SO Montpellier

Sources 
 Player page at the site of the FFF
 Player page at anciensverts.com
 Coach page at om1899.com
 Alain Pécheral, La Grande histoire de l'OM (Des origines à nos jours), L'Équipe, 2007. cf.  page 443.
 

French footballers
France international footballers
Montpellier HSC players
AS Saint-Étienne players
French football managers
Olympique de Marseille managers
Montpellier HSC managers
1909 births
Year of death missing
Association football forwards
Pays d'Aix FC players
Pays d'Aix FC managers